Bosley is a surname.

People
Notable people with the surname include:

 Bruce Bosley (born 1933), American footballer
 Freeman Bosley Jr. (born 1954), American politician
 John Bosley (politician) (born 1947), Canadian politician
 Keith Bosley (born 1937), British poet and translator
 Patricia Merbreier (1924–2011; nee Bosley), American actress
 Tom Bosley (1927–2010), American actor
 Todd Bosley (born 1984), American actor

Fictional characters 
 Dave Bosley, a fictional character from the 2015 film You, Me and the Apocalypse
 John Bosley (Charlie's Angels), a private detective in the Charlie's Angels TV series

See also

 
 Bosley (disambiguation)